The Šumadija District is one of eight administrative districts of Šumadija and Western Serbia. It is located in the central parts of the country. According to the 2011 census results, it has a population of 293,308 inhabitants, and the administrative center is the city of Kragujevac. The district is named after the geographical region of Šumadija.

Municipalities

The Šumadija District is divided into 6 municipalities and the city of Kragujevac. 
The municipalities of the district are:
 Aranđelovac
 Topola
 Rača
 Batočina
 Knić
 Lapovo

Demographics

According to the last official census done in 2011, the Šumadija District had 293,308 inhabitants. 64.9% of the population lived in urban areas. The  ethnic composition of the district:

Culture and history
In the vicinity of Kragujevac stand several medieval monasteries, including the Annunciation monastery Divostin from the thirteenth century; the St. Nicholas monastery, believed to have existed at the time of the Battle of Kosovo in 1389; and the Drača monastery from unknown times.

In 1833 the Kragujevac Grammar School, the first Serb-language grammar school south of the Sava and Danube rivers, was founded in Kragujevac. Over the last fifty years this city of Serbian schooling has borne a symbol of grief: in the Memorial Park in Šumarice stands a monument to the pupils and teachers of this grammar school who were executed in World War II. Seeking to set a frightening example for all Serbia, German fascists executed 7,000 citizens in Kragujevac over the course of a single day, October 21, 1941. Among them were about 300 pupils and 18 teachers, including 15 boys from the ages of 8 to 15.

See also
 Administrative divisions of Serbia
 Districts of Serbia
 Šumadija

References

Note: All official material made by Government of Serbia is public by law. Information was taken from {{url|https://web.archive.org/web/20090221052324/http://www.srbija.gov.rs/%7D%7D.

External links

 

 
Districts of Šumadija and Western Serbia